"I Adore Him" is a song written by Artie Kornfeld and Jan Berry and performed by The Angels.  The song was produced by Bob Feldman, Jerry Goldstein, and Richard Gottehrer and arranged by Alan Lorber.

Chart performance
"I Adore Him" reached #13 on the R&B chart and #25 on the Billboard Hot 100 in 1963.

References

1963 singles
The Angels (American group) songs
Song recordings produced by Jerry Goldstein (producer)
1963 songs
Songs written by Jan Berry
Songs written by Artie Kornfeld
Smash Records singles
Song recordings produced by Richard Gottehrer